The Dundee Rockets were an ice hockey club based in Dundee, Scotland. Founded in 1963, the club were founder members of the Northern League in 1967 and the British Hockey League in 1982. The club won eight titles before closing in 1987.

In 1963, the Dundee Rockets were founded. They took on the Tigers home ice and colours, although they wore a yellow and black strip in the mid to late 1960s. The head coach from 1969 to 1971 was Marshall Key. The Rockets won the Northern League in 1972-73 and 1981–82, the Scottish National League in 1981–82, and the British Championship in 1982. From 1983 to 1987 the Rockets played in the British Hockey League Premier Division, winning the league in 1982-83 (Section A) and 1983–84. They won the Heineken Championship in 1983 and 1984, and the Bluecol Autumn Cup in 1983–84.

Honours

Northern League: 1972–73, 1981–82
British Championship: 1981–82, 1982–83, 1983–84
British Hockey League: 1982–83, 1983–84
Autumn Cup: 1983-84

The Dundee Rockets also won the grandslam ( all the trophies there is to win in one season ) three years in a row

Jerseys

Ice hockey teams in Scotland
Sport in Dundee
Ice hockey clubs established in 1963
Ice hockey clubs disestablished in 1987
1963 establishments in Scotland
1987 disestablishments in Scotland